Gruta da Cabana (SP-108) is a limestone cave located inside the Alto Ribeira Tourist State Park, in the municipality of Apiaí, São Paulo, Brazil. Although under the protection influence of the other caves along the Areado Grande creek, the cave lies outside the borders of the park. It measures 4185 meters long and 74 meters deep. Recent studies proved that the cave is connected to Gruta Desmoronada (SP-74) through a test conducted by a group of geologists.

See also
List of caves in Brazil

References

External links
 Base de Dados do Ministerio do Meio Hambiente Governo Federal - ICMBIO Official Website

Caves of São Paulo (state)
Wild caves